Hamza Belahouel (born June 8, 1993 in Mostaganem) is an Algerian footballer who plays for MC Oran in the Algerian Ligue Professionnelle 1.

Career
On May 1, 2018, Belahouel scored two goals in USM Bel-Abbès' 2-1 win over JS Kabylie in the 2018 Algerian Cup Final.
In 2019, He signed a contract with CR Belouizdad.
In 2021, he joined CS Constantine.
In 2022, he joined MC Oran.

Honours
USM Bel-Abbès
 Algerian Cup (1): 2018

References

External links
 

1993 births
Algerian footballers
Algerian Ligue Professionnelle 1 players
ES Mostaganem players
Living people
People from Mostaganem
USM Bel Abbès players
MC Oran players
Association football forwards
21st-century Algerian people